The 2020 Cronulla-Sutherland Sharks season was the 54th in the club's history. The team was coached by John Morris and captained by Wade Graham. The team competed in the National Rugby League's 2020 Telstra Premiership. This season marked the first since 2001 without club legend Paul Gallen, who retired at the end of the 2019 season.

Milestones 
Round 1: Connor Tracey made his debut for the club, after previously playing for the South Sydney Rabbitohs.
Round 1: Toby Rudolf made his NRL debut for the club.
Round 2: Billy Magoulias scored his 1st career try.
Round 3: William Kennedy scored his 1st career try.
Round 4: Siosifa Talakai made his debut for the club, after previously playing for the South Sydney Rabbitohs.
Round 5: Mawene Hiroti scored his 1st try for the club.
Round 6: Royce Hunt made his debut for the club, after previously playing for the Canberra Raiders.
Round 8: Royce Hunt scored his 1st career try.
Round 9: Nene Macdonald made his debut for the club, after previously playing for the North Queensland Cowboys and scored his 1st try for the club.
Round 11: Teig Wilton made his NRL debut for the club.
Round 12: Aaron Woods played his 200th career game.
Round 12: Jackson Ferris made his NRL debut and scored his 1st career try for the club.
Round 12: Braydon Trindall made his NRL debut for the club.
Round 12: Siosifa Talakai scored his 1st try for the club.
Round 12: Connor Tracey scored his 1st career try.
Round 13: Josh Dugan played his 200th career game.
Round 13: Jesse Ramien played his 50th career game.
Round 13: Wade Graham played his 200th game for the club.
Round 14: Matt Moylan kicked his 1st goal for the club.
Round 16: Braydon Trindall kicked his 1st career goal.
Round 17: Josh Dugan played his 50th game for the club.
Round 17: Bryson Goodwin kicked his 1st goal for the club.
Round 18: Toby Rudolf scored his 1st career try.
Round 19: Sione Katoa kicked his 1st career goal.
Round 20: Daniel Vasquez made his NRL debut for the club.
Round 20: Mawene Hiroti kicked his 1st career goal.

Harvey Norman Women's Premiership

Regular season

Source:

Finals series

At the end of Round 1, the NSWRL announced the immediate suspension of the Harvey Norman Women's Premiership due to the COVID-19 pandemic. It was later announced that the season would resume and the competition restarted from 18 July.

Jersey Flegg Cup (U20)

Regular season

Source:

On 27 March, the 2020 Jersey Flegg Cup was cancelled due to the COVID-19 pandemic.

Canterbury Cup NSW (Newtown Jets)

Regular season

Source:

On 27 March, the 2020 Canterbury Cup NSW was cancelled due to the COVID-19 pandemic.

Fixtures

Pre-season

Regular season

Source:

From Round 2, the NRL announced that matches would be played behind closed doors until further notice due to the ongoing and escalating COVID-19 situation. At the end of the round however the NRL ceded to the dangers of the pandemic, announcing the immediate and indefinite suspension of the 2020 NRL season due to the COVID-19 pandemic. The season was announced to be reinstated from 28 May and matches were redrawn due to the resulting shortened season.

Finals series

Ladder

Squad

Player movements
Source:

Losses
 Jayden Brailey to Newcastle Knights
 Kurt Capewell to Penrith Panthers
 Sosaia Feki to Castleford Tigers
 Kyle Flanagan to Sydney Roosters
 Paul Gallen to retirement
 Aaron Gray to released
 Jaimin Jolliffe to Gold Coast Titans
 Josh Morris to Sydney Roosters (mid-season)
 Matt Prior to Leeds Rhinos
 Cruz Topai-Aveai to released (mid-season)
 Bronson Xerri to suspended (mid-season)

Gains

 Bryson Goodwin from South Sydney Rabbitohs (mid-season)
 Mawene Hiroti from South Sydney Rabbitohs
 Royce Hunt from Canberra Raiders
 Cameron King from Featherstone Rovers
 Nene Macdonald from free agent (mid-season)
 Kyle Paterson from Canberra Raiders
 Jesse Ramien from Newcastle Knights
 Siosifa Talakai from Newtown Jets
 Connor Tracey from South Sydney Rabbitohs
 Jack A Williams from Newtown Jets

Representative honours
The following players have played a first grade representative match in 2020. (C) = Captain

1 – Andrew Fifita was originally selected to play, but was subsequently forced to withdraw following injury.

Squad statistics 
Statistics Source:

References

Cronulla-Sutherland Sharks seasons
Cronulla-Sutherland Sharks season